The Rhode Island State Navy was the first colonial or state navy established after the American Revolutionary War began in April 1775 with the Battles of Lexington and Concord.  On the following June 15, the General Assembly authorized the acquisition of two ships for the purpose of defending the colony's trade.  The state's ships were generally used for defensive operations within Narragansett Bay, although some prizes were taken.  The state was also one of the first to authorize privateering.

Early establishment and legislative history
Following the outbreak of the American Revolutionary War, the Royal Navy sent , a frigate commanded James Wallace as captain to put a halt to smuggling out of Newport.  On June 13, 1775, Nicholas Cooke, the colony's lieutenant governor, officially asked Wallace to return two ships he had captured.  Two days later, the General Assembly authorized the Committee of Safety to acquire two ships for the purpose of defending the colony's trade, established a committee to oversee the acquisition and fitting of the ships, and appointed Abraham Whipple as commodore of the fleet. Two sloops were purchased, called Katy and Washington.  Commodore Whipple reported that the same day, June 15, he captured a tender of Rose.  The navy was organized under, and subject to the direction of, the state's militia generals.

In January 1776 two more ships were authorized, and an admiralty court was established to adjudicate maritime matters, including the distribution of prizes. The legislation also authorized the governor to issue letters of marque, making privateering possible.  The latter legislation was amended the following May to harmonize it with Continental Navy regulations.  About 200 ships engaged in privateering on behalf of the state.

The General Assembly authorized two more armed ships in 1777, but neither was apparently acquired.  It also authorized the purchase of merchant ships for the state's use, which resulted in the acquisition two sloops, Aurora and Diamond.  Further authorizations occurred in 1778 in supported of an anticipated expedition to expel the British from Newport (which failed in the August Battle of Rhode Island), but were only fulfilled later, with the acquisition of the galley  and the sloop Argo, which were commanded by Continental Army Lieutenant Colonel Silas Talbot.

The last ship commissioned by the state of Rhode Island was Rover, a sloop that saw only brief service in 1781.

Naval operations
Katy and Washington primarily cruised in Narragansett Bay in 1775. In August, General George Washington, seeking any possible supplies of gunpowder, suggested that the Rhode Island ships be used for an expedition to Nassau where there was believed to be a supply of gunpowder. Katy was sent on this errand in September, returning without success, as the powder had been removed. She was then used in November to transport Esek Hopkins and other recruits to Philadelphia for service in the recently created Continental Navy.

Washington fate is uncertain; she sometimes left the bay to warn arriving ships of British threats, but was not particularly seaworthy, and was probably returned to her original owner.

Both saw service in the defense of New York City in the fall of 1776, but returned to Rhode Island waters. Spitfire ran aground at the northern end of Rhode Island in March 1777 and was burned to prevent her capture by the British. Washington was reported to blow up near Bristol in April 1777.

Colonel Talbot, as commander of Pigot and Argo, captured a number of prizes, and was ultimately rewarded with a Continental Navy commission; the two ships ended their service in 1780.

See also
 Rhode Island Naval Militia

References

  This work contains summary information on each of the various state navies.
Arnold, Samuel.  History of the state of Rhode Island and Providence plantations, Volume 2
Field, Edward.  Revolutionary Defences in Rhode Island

Disbanded navies
Navy
Military units and formations of the United States in the American Revolutionary War